Haslingden F.C. was a football club based in Rossendale, Lancashire. In 1994, they won the North West Counties Football League Division Two. Haslingden played at Ewood Bridge, later used by Stand Athletic and were members of the North West Counties League between 1993 and 1998. Although Division Two Champions in their first season Haslingden were not promoted until finishing runners up in 1997. They completed just one season in the top flight, finishing 16/22 before financial difficulties signalled the end of the line for the club based adjacent to the East Lancashire Railway. The Ewood Bridge ground forlorn and overgrown is still extant today.

The town of Haslingden is today represented by Haslingden St.Mary's F.C. of the West Lancashire Football League. The club play at South Shore Street close to Haslingden town centre.

The final goal at the ground was scored by Lloyd Green in a 3 2 win against Kidsgrove to ensure the team at least finished on a high.

Honours
North West Counties Football League Division Two
Champions 1993–94
Runners-up 1996–97
Lancashire Combination Division Two
Champions 1910–11
West Lancashire League Division Two
Runners-up 1992–93

See also
Stand Athletic F.C.

References

Defunct football clubs in England
Lancashire Combination
North West Counties Football League clubs
Defunct football clubs in Greater Manchester